The combination classification was one of the primary awards in the Vuelta a España cycling stage race. This classification was calculated by adding the numeral ranks of each cyclist in the general, points, and mountains classifications (a rider must have had a score in all classifications possible to qualify for the combination classification), with the lowest cumulative total signifying the leader of this competition.

From 2006 to 2018, the leader of the classification wore a white jersey; in 2005 it was a golden-green jersey.

The award strongly favoured top riders in the competition. Since its re-introduction in 2002, it was only won by someone other than the race's overall winner four times: in 2002, 2003, 2012, and 2015. On all four of those occasions, the winning cyclist was placed either second or third in the overall classification.

The combination classification was discontinued in 2019. Now, the white jersey is worn by the best young rider.

The Vuelta was the last major race to feature a combination classification.

Winners

1970 
1971 
1972 
1973 
1974 
1985 
1986 
1987 
1988 
1989 
1990 
1991 
1992 
1993 
2002 
2003 
2004 
2005 
2006 
2007 
2008 
2009 
2010 
2011 
2012 
2013 
2014 
2015 
2016 
2017 
2018

Most wins

References

Combination Classification
Combination classification in road cycling
Spanish sports trophies and awards